Claude Godart (born 20 October 1980) is a Luxembourgian athlete specialising in the sprint hurdles. He won multiple medals at the Games of the Small States of Europe.

His personal bests are 13.95 seconds in the 110 metres hurdles (+1.3 m/s, Dudelange 2007) and 8.03 seconds in the 60 metres hurdles (Kirchberg 2007). Both are current national records.

International competitions

References

1980 births
Living people
Luxembourgian male hurdlers
Athletes (track and field) at the 2015 European Games
Sportspeople from Luxembourg City
European Games competitors for Luxembourg